Olav Hestenes (11 February 193029 November 1996) was a Norwegian barrister.

He was born in Tromsø, a son of Ola Hestenes and Gerda Kristine Larsen, and was a brother of journalist Arne Hestenes. He represented the defendant in more than two hundred murder cases, including several with high media profile. He wrote two autobiographical books, Kamp i sort kappe from 1990, and Underveis med hvite hansker from 1992.

References

1930 births
1996 deaths
People from Tromsø
20th-century Norwegian lawyers
Norwegian autobiographers
20th-century Norwegian writers